Meteor Apocalypse is a 2010 American science fiction film directed by Micho Rutare.

Plot
A long-period comet is determined to be on a collision course with Earth. All of the world's nuclear states fire intercontinental ballistic missiles at the comet but only succeed in breaking it into fragments. Pieces of the comet soon begin to impact the ground.

Research scientist David Dmatti (Joe Lando) is asleep when his co-worker Mark calls him and requests urgent help. He arrives at his workplace to find Mark suffering from convulsions. David realizes that there are toxins in the water. Mark dies before David narrowly avoids a meteor shower that kills the paramedics and destroys his work site.

David's daughter Alison (Madison McLaughlin) also becomes ill after drinking the water. Afterwards, the United States government discovers that the comet carries a deadly pathogen that has contaminated Lake Mead and orders a quarantine. David is separated from wife Kate (Claudia Christian) and Alison as they are taken away. He escapes from the troops and makes his way to the Las Vegas Valley to find a colleague who is working on an antidote.

On the way to Las Vegas, David finds and revives an unconscious young woman named Lynn (Cooper Harris) at a gas station. He learns that she is also suffering from the illness and brings her with him. When they arrive, they watch as most of the city is destroyed by a meteor shower and learn the quarantined were transferred to Los Angeles. David is able to get an experimental antidote for the mysterious illness and gives some of it to Lynn.

When it is discovered that the largest comet fragment will most likely hit Los Angeles, a panicked evacuation is begun. The United States Secretary of Homeland Security cancels the evacuation to conserve resources, but his team defies his order and continues to assist with the evacuation. A pastor convinces David and Lynn to seek shelter for the night at her church before they leave the next day. David uses the experimental antidote to save a girl, and learns from her mother about a location where his wife and daughter might be. He and Lynn narrowly escape as more meteorites destroy the church.

Lynn dies from her illness after having saved the antidote for Alison. David overcomes his fear of heights and scales a steep cliff to find his wife and daughter. He uses the antidote to treat Alison's illness, and the three watch from a safe distance as the final fragment strikes the city.

Cast
 Gregory Paul Smith as Damien
 Joe Lando as David Dematti
 Claudia Christian as Kate Dematti
 Cooper Harris as Lynn Leigh
 Brendan Andolsek Bradley as Curtis Langley
 Sueann Han as Candace Mills
 Madison McLaughlin as Alison DeMatti
 Peter Husmann as Jack Nielson
 Jennifer Smart as Madeline
 David Dustin Kenyon as Dustin Landau, Marauder

Production
The film is produced and is distributed by The Asylum Films.

Release
The release date for the film in North America was February 23, 2010

References

External links
 
 
 
 

2010 films
2010 horror films
2010 independent films
2010 science fiction action films
American science fiction horror films
American disaster films
American science fiction action films
Films set in the Las Vegas Valley
Films about impact events
The Asylum films
Films directed by Micho Rutare
2010 directorial debut films
2010s English-language films
2010s American films